ALL Ladies League (ALL) is an international women’s chamber for the welfare and empowering women’s leadership.  The organization was founded in 2015 by Harbeen Arora.

Activities 
ALL confers Awards. Distinguished people who have received the Women of the Decade awards include Sania Mirza, Saina Nehwal, Chanda Kocchar, Naina Lal Kidwai, Shobhana Bhartia, Sharmila Tagore, Ritu Kumar, Somdutta SinghSangeeta Reddy, Jodie Underhill and others. It has also conferred Grassroots Women of the Decade awards to recognize and felicitate rural women leaders in different spheres.

References

International women's organizations
Women's organisations based in India